Waipu may refer to:

New Zealand
Waipu Lagoons, near New Plymouth
Waipu, New Zealand, town in Northland
Waipu River, river in Northland

Taiwan
Waipu District, Taichung
Waipu Fishing Port, Miaoli County